LiveView might mean:

Live preview in digital cameras
Sony Ericsson LiveView